Frederico Viegas (born 25 October 1974) is a former professional race car driver born in Portugal.

Having started his career in karting during 1991, Viegas went on to win the Portuguese and European Formula Ford titles in 1992 and 1993 respectively, always driving for Swift. In 1994, he competed in German Formula Three for the KMS team, driving in the Italian Superformula Championship during 1995. His last full racing season was the Portuguese Renault Mégane Trophy in 1997.

External links

1974 births
Living people
Portuguese racing drivers
Formula Ford drivers
German Formula Three Championship drivers
EFDA Nations Cup drivers